Tipton is a town in the West Midlands, England.

Tipton may also refer to:

Places

Australia 
 Tipton, Queensland, a locality in the Toowoomba Region

United Kingdom 
 Tipton Municipal Borough, a former local authority centred on Tipton, Birmingham, England
 Tipton St John, Devon

United States
Tipton, California
Tipton, Indiana
Tipton, Iowa
Tipton, Kansas
Tipton, Michigan
Tipton, Missouri
Tipton, Oklahoma
Tipton, Pennsylvania
Tipton, Tennessee
Tipton County, Indiana
Tipton County, Tennessee
Tipton Airport, Odenton Maryland
Tipton Peak, Nevada

Other uses
Tipton (surname)
The Tipton Hotel and London Tipton, a fictional place and character in the television series The Suite Life of Zack and Cody
Tipton Harriers, athletics club in Tipton, England